How Could You, Jean? is a 1918 American silent comedy-drama film, starring Mary Pickford, directed by William Desmond Taylor, and based on a novel by Eleanor Hoyt Brainerd. Casson Ferguson was the male lead; Spottiswoode Aitken and a young ZaSu Pitts had supporting roles.

This is a lost film, with no known surviving prints.

Plot

The plot involves a young socialite pretending to be a cook, who falls in love with a man she thinks is a hired hand, but he is actually a millionaire. The film was not well received by critics, who generally found it pleasant but dull, although The New York Times called it "a funny, extremely well-produced comedy".

Cast

Film with similar plot
A novel by Norwegian writer Sigrid Boo, Vi som går kjøkkenveien (We Who Enter Through the Kitchen) has an almost identical plot to Brainerd's original book. Boo's novel was adapted for the American film Servants' Entrance (1934) starring Janet Gaynor, which had an identical plot to the 1918 film. As The New York Times commented, "apparently, the old Pickford comedy was already forgotten, and no copyright infringement suit was filed."

See also
List of lost films

References

External links

 

1918 films
1918 comedy-drama films
1910s English-language films
American silent feature films
American black-and-white films
Films based on American novels
Lost American films
Films directed by William Desmond Taylor
Paramount Pictures films
Films with screenplays by Frances Marion
1918 lost films
Lost comedy-drama films
1910s American films
Silent American comedy-drama films